Nevi and melanomas are a group of neoplasia.

Although a nevus and a melanoma are often treated as independent entities, there is evidence that a nevus can be a precursor for a melanoma.

Common mutations have been identified in nevi and melanomas.

See also 
 List of cutaneous conditions

References

External links 

Melanocytic nevi and neoplasms
Dermatologic terminology